How Time Passes is the debut album by trumpeter Don Ellis recorded in 1960 and released on the Candid label.

Reception

Scott Yanow of Allmusic states, "Trumpeter Don Ellis' initial recording as a leader (and first of four small group dates from the 1960-1962 period) found him stretching the boundaries of bop-based jazz and experimenting a bit with time and tempo... Although these musical experiments failed to be influential (Ellis himself went in a different direction a few years later), the unpredictable music is still quite interesting to hear". The Penguin Guide to Jazz award the album 3 stars.

Track listing 
All compositions by Don Ellis except as indicated
 "How Time Passes" - 6:30   
 "Sallie" - 4:38   
 "A Simplex One" - 4:17   
 "Waste" (Jaki Byard) - 8:15   
 "Improvisational Suite #1" - 22:18

Personnel 
Don Ellis - trumpet
Jaki Byard - piano, alto saxophone
Ron Carter - bass 
Charlie Persip - drums

References 

Don Ellis albums
1960 debut albums
Albums produced by Nat Hentoff
Candid Records albums